Su Wen-ho (born 10 December 1945) is a Taiwanese sprinter. He competed in the 100 metres at the 1968 Summer Olympics and the 1972 Summer Olympics.

References

1945 births
Living people
Athletes (track and field) at the 1968 Summer Olympics
Athletes (track and field) at the 1972 Summer Olympics
Taiwanese male sprinters
Taiwanese male long jumpers
Olympic athletes of Taiwan
Place of birth missing (living people)
Asian Games medalists in athletics (track and field)
Asian Games bronze medalists for Chinese Taipei
Athletes (track and field) at the 1966 Asian Games
Medalists at the 1966 Asian Games
20th-century Taiwanese people